David Bell may refer to:

Academia
 David Bell (university administrator) (born 1959), Scottish academic administrator and civil servant
 David Bell (philosopher) (born 1947), British philosopher
 David Bell (artist) (1915–1959), British curator and writer
 David Bell (historian) (born 1961), American historian of France
 David Bell (author) (born 1969), American author and professor
 David Charles Bell (1817–1902), British scholar, author and professor

Sportspeople
 David Bell (golfer) (born 1880), Scottish golfer
 David Bell (field hockey) (born 1955), Australian field hockey player and coach
 David Bell (baseball) (born 1972), Former American baseball player and current manager of the Cincinnati Reds
 David Bell (basketball) (born 1981), American basketball player
 David Bell (sportsman) (born 1949), Scottish rugby union and cricket representative

Footballers 
 Dave Bell (1909–1986), Scottish footballer
 David Bell (footballer, born 1985), Irish footballer
 David Bell (footballer, born 1984), Irish footballer
 David Bell (Australian footballer) (1890–1961), Australian rules footballer
 David Bell (American football) (born 2000), American football wide receiver

Others
 David Bell (Australian politician) (1828–1894), New South Wales politician
 David Bell (Irish Republican) (1818–1890)
 David Bell (television executive) (1937–1990), Scottish television producer and director
 David Bell (VC) (1845–1920), Irish soldier
 David E. Bell (1919–2000), American civil servant
 David Bell (composer) (born 1954), American composer
 David Sheffield Bell, American physician, and researcher
 David Bell (publisher) (born 1946), American publisher

See also
 David Belle (born 1973), French actor, film choreographer, and stunt coordinator